The Cape Dory 330 is an American sailboat that was designed by Carl Alberg as a cruiser and first built in 1985.

The Cape Dory 330 is a development of the Cape Dory 33, with a bowsprit and cutter rig, plus interior changes.

Production
The design was built by Cape Dory Yachts in the United States. The company built 27 examples of the type between 1985 and 1988, but it is now out of production.

Design
The Cape Dory 330 is a recreational keelboat, built predominantly of fiberglass, with wood trim. It has a cutter rig, a spooned raked stem, a bowsprit, a raised counter transom, a keel-mounted rudder controlled by a wheel and a fixed long keel. It displaces  and carries  of ballast.

The boat is fitted with an inboard engine for docking and maneuvering.

The galley is located on the port side at the foot of the companionway steps and includes a sink and two-burner stove. The head is forward on the starboard side and has a privacy door. Accommodations include a bow "V"-berth and two main cabin settee berths. There is a folding dinette table and a chart table in the main cabin, too.

The mainsail is sheeted mid-boom to a mainsheet traveler on the cabin roof. The inner jib is self-tacking and is boom mounted.

Operational history
The boat is supported by an active class club that organizes racing events, the Cape Dory Sailboat Owners Association.

See also
List of sailing boat types

Related development
Cape Dory 33

Similar sailboats
Abbott 33
Alajuela 33
Arco 33
C&C 33
CS 33
Endeavour 33
Hans Christian 33
Hunter 33
Hunter 33.5
Mirage 33
Nonsuch 33
Tanzer 10
Viking 33
Watkins 33

References

Keelboats
1980s sailboat type designs
Sailing yachts
Sailboat type designs by Carl Alberg
Sailboat types built by Cape Dory Yachts